Peter Bartlett (born August 28, 1942) is an American actor.

With appearances on shows such as Law & Order and films such as Meet the Parents, Bartlett portrayed Nigel Bartholomew-Smythe on the ABC soap opera, One Life to Live. He had portrayed this role from 1991 until the soap's cancellation in 2012. In 2009, he began portraying Nigel's English cousin Neville. In 2004 he appeared on Broadway playing the role of Pluto in The Frogs, the Stephen Sondheim-Burt Shevelove-Nathan Lane adaptation which played at the Vivian Beaumont Theater at Lincoln Center. His lively performance was well received by critics and audiences, and Stephen Sondheim has stated that Mr. Bartlett's delivery of the line, "Get out of town!" (preserved on the original cast recording by PS Classics) was a highlight of the show. He also starred in the 2009 Disney film The Princess and the Frog as a valet named Lawrence. He starred on Broadway in The Drowsy Chaperone as Underling, the butler. He opened to highly favorable reviews in the Broadway revival of Rodgers and Hammerstein's Cinderella on March 3, 2013, playing the Prince's calculating Regent, Sebastian. He later played several roles in the hit Broadway musical Something Rotten!, and appeared as the flabbergasted "Head Waiter" in the Roundabout revival of She Loves Me in 2016.

Since 1993, the openly gay Bartlett has been frequently associated with the plays of gay playwright Paul Rudnick, beginning with the latter's Off-Broadway success Jeffrey in circa 1993–1994 and continuing through The Most Fabulous Story Ever Told (1998) and The Naked Truth (1994).

Credits

Theatre
Source: Internet Broadway Database

Film

Television

Video games

Awards and nominations

References

External links
Internet Broadway Database

1942 births
Living people
American male soap opera actors
American male television actors
American male voice actors
American gay actors
Male actors from Chicago